The Impossible Game is a 2009 one-button platform game developed and published by Fluke Games. The Windows, macOS and Linux port was developed by Grip Games.

Gameplay 

The objective of the game is to guide a cube over spikes and pits. There are 5 levels in the game (2 in iOS and Android normal versions), four of which with original music.

In Normal Mode, If the player dies in this mode, the level starts over.

In Practice Mode, flags (checkpoints) can be placed. If the player dies in this mode, the player respawns at the flag they recently placed. Each time a level is beaten, a medal is awarded depending on the way they beat it.

Level editor 
On the PC version of the game, there is a level editor available, which players can use to make their own levels, and custom music may be used.

Reception 

The Impossible Game received generally mixed reviews. On Metacritic, the PC version received an aggregated score of 64. On GameRankings, it received 60% on Xbox 360, 67% on iOS, 87% on PSP, and 67% on PC. Eurogamer gave the Xbox 360 version a 6/10, stating that "it's monumentally frustrating, but also bafflingly addictive as you continually try to make precious progress".

See also 
Geometry Dash, a game with a similar gameplay mechanism as one of the prominent features, and was originally inspired by The Impossible Game.
The Impossible Game 2, a sequel by Fluke Games announced in 2021.

References

External links 
 

Platform games
2009 video games
Android (operating system) games
IOS games
PlayStation 3 games
PlayStation Network games
PlayStation Portable games
Video games developed in the Czech Republic
Indie video games
Windows games
Xbox 360 Live Arcade games
Grip Digital games